Tulbaghieae is a tribe of plants belonging to the subfamily Allioideae of the Amaryllis family (Amaryllidaceae). It comprises two genera, Tulbaghia and Prototulbaghia, native to South Africa.

Description 
Corm shaped bulb or rhizome. Leaf sheaths short. Flowers possess a corona, pseudocorona or a fleshy perigonal ring.

References

Bibliography 

 Missouri Botanical Garden

Allioideae
Monocot tribes